Calathus complanatus is a species of ground beetle from the Platyninae subfamily that is endemic to Madeira.

References

complanatus
Beetles described in 1828
Endemic fauna of Madeira
Beetles of Europe